A number of units of measurement were used in Oman.

System before metric system

Several units were used.

Muscat

Length

One muscat was equal to 39.13 in.

Mass

Units included:

1 maund = 24 kotschas =  lb

1 candy = 60 maunds.

Capacity

One ferren was equal to 7.9254 gallons and also equal to 34 sidios.

References

Omani culture
Oman